Earl L. Engbritson (August 6, 1908 – May 3, 1994) was an American educator and politician.

Engbritson was born, on a farm, in Jackson County, Minnesota and went to the public schools. He received his bachelor's degree from Minnesota State University, Mankato in 1928. Engbritson live in Hollandale, Freeborn County, Minnesota with his wife and family. He was involved with education and served as the school principal and as the school superintendent. Engbritson served in the Minnesota Senate  from 1951 to 1954. He died in Albert Lea, Minnesota. The funeral and burial was in Hollandale, Minnesota.

References

1908 births
1994 deaths
People from Freeborn County, Minnesota
People from Jackson County, Minnesota
Minnesota State University, Mankato alumni
Educators from Minnesota
Minnesota state senators